The Federal Mediation and Conciliation Service may refer to either:
Federal Mediation and Conciliation Service (Canada)
Federal Mediation and Conciliation Service (United States)